Fox Harris (May 3, 1936 – December 27, 1988) was an American actor known for such films as Repo Man, Sid and Nancy, Straight to Hell, Hollywood Chainsaw Hookers, The Underachievers and Dr. Caligari.

Harris worked frequently with film directors Alex Cox and Fred Olen Ray.

Harris died of lung cancer in 1988 at age 52 in Century City, California.

Partial filmography
Forbidden World (1982) - Cal Timbergen
Hammett (1982) - Frank the News Vendor
Human Highway (1982) - Sheik
My Favorite Year (1982) - Curt / Featured Player
Lookin' to Get Out (1982) - Harvey - The Elevator Operator
Rock 'n' Roll Hotel (1983)
Repo Man (1984) - J. Frank Parnell
Sid and Nancy (1986) - Old Stain
Armed Response (1986) - Club Owner
Straight to Hell (1987) - Kim Blousson
Evil Spawn (1987) - Harry
Walker (1987) - District Attorney
The Underachievers (1987) - Margrave
Hollywood Chainsaw Hookers (1988) - Hermie
Deep Space (1988) - Prof. Whately
Warlords (1988) - Colonel Cox
Terminal Force (1989) - Hendrix
Mutant on the Bounty (1989) - Captain Ferris
Dr. Caligari (1989) - Dr. Avol
Terror Eyes (1989) - Ticket Man
Alienator (1990) - Burt
Nerds of a Feather (1990) - Russian Scientist

References

External links

1936 births
1988 deaths
American male film actors
American male television actors
Male actors from Pennsylvania
20th-century American male actors